Sleep Token are a British rock band from London, England, formed in 2016. The group are an anonymous, masked collective, led by a frontman using the moniker Vessel. They have been categorised under many different genres, including alternative metal, post-rock/metal, progressive metal and indie rock/pop. After self-releasing their debut extended play (EP) One in 2016, the band signed with Basick Records and issued a follow-up, Two, the next year. The group later signed with Spinefarm Records in 2019 and released their debut full-length album Sundowning, which was followed in 2021 by This Place Will Become Your Tomb. A third studio album, Take Me Back to Eden, is scheduled for release in May 2023.

History

2016–2019: Beginnings and early releases
Sleep Token debuted in September 2016 with the release of their first single, "Thread the Needle". The track was followed in December by the band's debut EP One, which featured two additional songs plus alternative piano arrangements of all three tracks. In May 2017, it was announced that Sleep Token had signed with independent label Basick Records and would release their second EP Two in July. Ahead of the EP's release, the group issued two new singles – "Calcutta" in May and "Nazareth" in June. In the publication's exclusive premiere of "Calcutta", Metal Hammer writer Luke Morton described the song as "an odd and unique mix of technical metal and expansive indie soundscapes". Reviewing Two for Distorted Sound, Matt Corcoran also noted the combination of elements from multiple genres, explaining that "Across these three spellbinding tracks the band fully delivers on their genre-blending promise, moving between light indie atmospherics and dark, Meshuggah-esque heaviness and covering most of the spectrum in between."

Just before the release of Two, Sleep Token made their live debut at the Black Heart in London on 17 June 2017. Shows later in the year included performances at the O2 Academy Islington supporting Norwegian band Motorpsycho in October, and at Student Central supporting French synthwave artist Perturbator in December. During early 2018, they also supported Loathe alongside Holding Absence, played at festivals including Camden Rocks, and performed at Maida Vale Studios for the BBC Radio 1 Rock Show. In June the band released the first in a string of standalone singles, "Jaws". A cover version of Outkast's "Hey Ya!" followed in August, ahead of the band's performance at Reading and Leeds Festivals that month. In October, they released "The Way That You Were" and played their first headline (and eleventh overall) show at St Pancras Old Church, tickets for which reportedly sold out in 30 seconds. "Jaws" and "The Way That You Were" were later issued together on 10" vinyl for Record Store Day in 2021.

2019–2022: Signing to Spinefarm and first two albums
In June 2019, it was announced that Sleep Token had signed with Universal subsidiary Spinefarm Records. At the same time, the band's debut full-length album Sundowning was confirmed for a November release, with "The Night Does Not Belong to God" released as the first track from the record. The group continued issuing songs from the album every two weeks up to the release of the album. Sundowning received generally positive reviews from music critics – Kerrang! columnist Tom Shepherd gave the album a rating of four out of five, writing that it contains "moments here to truly savour, and ideas and experiences that feel unique", but noting that "the continuous nature of this dark mood entwined with the group's slow-burning, listless pace does begin to drag across [its] 50-minute runtime". Prior to the album's release, Sleep Token played two sold-out shows in London and Manchester; after its release, they embarked on their first North American tour supporting metalcore group Issues alongside Polyphia and Lil Aaron.

After a short UK tour at the beginning of the year, several shows due to feature Sleep Token during 2020 were cancelled due to the COVID–19 pandemic. These included planned appearances at Knotfest Japan in March, Download Festival in June, and Madrid's Mad Cool in July. During the summer, the band released an expanded version of Sundowning with four new piano-based tracks collectively known as The Room Below, which included cover versions of Billie Eilish's "When the Party's Over" and Whitney Houston's "I Wanna Dance with Somebody (Who Loves Me)". The group were due to return to live performances in March 2021 with five socially-distanced shows called "The Isolation Rituals", however these were ultimately cancelled due to ongoing pandemic-related concerns. They eventually returned in the summer, headlining the second stage at the Download Festival Pilot on 18 June. The day before, the band announced their second album This Place Will Become Your Tomb and released a new single, "Alkaline".

"Alkaline" was followed in August and September by "The Love You Want" and "Fall for Me", respectively. This Place Will Become Your Tomb was released on 24 September 2021 and gave Sleep Token their first chart positions when it debuted at number 39 on the UK Albums Chart and number 13 on the Scottish Albums Chart. The album was promoted on an eight-date headline tour of the UK and Ireland in November, with support from A.A. Williams. In January 2022, Sleep Token were featured as a cover artist for Metal Hammer magazine. More shows followed in the spring and summer – in April, frontman Vessel performed an "intimate" solo show (joined by only three backing vocalists) dubbed A Ritual from the Room Below; in May, the group supported Architects alongside Malevolence on a short UK tour; and in the summer, they played several festivals including Download, as well as touring Australia with Northlane. Later dates followed in North America supporting In This Moment with Nothing More and Cherry Bombs.

2022–present: Recent events and third studio album
Towards the end of 2022, Sleep Token announced a UK headline tour for January 2023 supported by Northlane, as well as an Australian tour for April/May. Ahead of a string of shows in Germany, the band released the single "Chokehold", their first new material since This Place Will Become Your Tomb, on 5 January 2023. This was followed by "The Summoning" the next day, "Granite" two weeks later, and "Aqua Regia" the day after. All four tracks released since the start of 2023 will be released on the band's upcoming third album, Take Me Back to Eden, which is set for release in May 2023.

Artistry, identity and musical style
Since their formation, Sleep Token have remained entirely anonymous – Rich Hobson of Metal Hammer explains that the members, who all wear masks and cloaks, "obscure their faces, they don't talk onstage, and they have only ever done one interview". The lead singer and primary songwriter of the band is known by the moniker "Vessel". The group's focus on anonymity and visual style have been likened to similar practices employed by Ghost, Slipknot, and Gwar. In 2017, Sleep Token's then-new label Basick Records published a description of the band which read, "A band that goes above and beyond simply writing and playing music, Sleep Token are said to be "the mortal representatives of the ancient deity known only as 'Sleep', led by the masked and cloaked figure appointed 'Vessel' ... the master creator behind the music." In the band's only reported interview to date, with Metal Hammer at the time of their signing with Basick, frontman Vessel expanded on the lore of the band, stating that "We are here to serve Sleep and project His message." When asked about Sleep, he stated that "He is everywhere, at all times. Vessel encountered Sleep in a dream, with promise of glory and magnificence if Vessel followed Him."

Musically, Sleep Token have been categorised in a wide range of genres, including alternative metal, post-rock/metal, progressive metal, and indie rock/pop. Hobson has suggested that the band has a "fluid approach to genre", claiming that they incorporate "elements of everything from tech metal and alternative to pop and R&B". Similarly, John D. Buchanan of the website AllMusic has written that Sleep Token "combine post-rock, post-classical, and post-metal tropes with soulful indie pop vocals into a blend that sounds like nothing else". The band's label Spinefarm Records has simply stated that "in a world of form and genre, Sleep Token cannot be confined". The band have been vague about their influences, simply crediting "a plethora of artists" as inspiration; early in their career, though, they did name Leprous, Agent Fresco, Bon Iver and Meshuggah as influences. Commentators have also posited performers such as Deftones, Cult of Luna, Explosions in the Sky and Ólafur Arnalds as possible influences.

Discography

Studio albums

Extended plays

Singles

Music videos

References

External links
Official website

2016 establishments in England
Musical groups established in 2016
British alternative metal musical groups
English progressive metal musical groups
English post-rock groups
Spinefarm Records artists
Bands with fictional stage personas
Occult rock musical groups
Masked musicians